Thembinkosi "Terror" Fanteni (born 2 February 1984) is a South African football striker.

He was part of the South African squad at the 2008 African Nations Cup and the 2009 FIFA Confederations Cup.

International goals

External links
 
 

1984 births
South African soccer players
South Africa international soccer players
South African expatriate soccer players
Living people
Sportspeople from Paarl
Cape Town Spurs F.C. players
Maccabi Haifa F.C. players
Orlando Pirates F.C. players
Expatriate footballers in Israel
South African expatriate sportspeople in Israel
Association football forwards
2009 FIFA Confederations Cup players
2008 Africa Cup of Nations players
Bidvest Wits F.C. players
Soccer players from the Western Cape